Gareth Liddiard (born 20 November 1975) is an Australian musician, best known as a founding member of both The Drones and Tropical Fuck Storm. Musically active since 1997, he has also released a solo album titled Strange Tourist in 2010. In 2021, Liddiard recorded and performed live with Jim White of the Dirty Three and Chris Abrahams of The Necks as Springtime.

Liddiard has often been called one of Australia's greatest songwriters and The Drones song "Shark Fin Blues", penned by Liddiard and Rui Pereira, was voted by the band's contemporaries as the greatest Australian song of all time in 2009.

Early life
Liddiard was born in Port Hedland, Western Australia and then his family lived in South West London until they returned to Western Australia where he started school in Perth. Initially his musical interest lay in jazz and he began playing the saxophone but he eventually found his way to rock and roll music and started playing in bands during his high school years in the city's northern beach suburbs, around Sorrento, at Duncraig High School. As a teenager, Liddiard listened to the music of artists such as Led Zeppelin, Jimi Hendrix, Black Flag and John Coltrane.

At the age of 18 years, Liddiard gained employment with a concert lighting firm in Perth and remained in this role for seven years, working with festivals such as the Big Day Out and bands such as Kim Salmon and the Surrealists. In regard to his development as a musician during this time, Liddiard explained in 2013: "Everything came together slowly and organically. It was only when Rui Pereira (high school friend) and I moved to Melbourne in 2000 that we thought of trying to make some money out of music. Before that I'd never considered the idea of being an entertainer."

Music
Liddiard formed The Drones with Pereira in 1997 and then relocated with the band to Victoria in 2000. The Drones have released six studio albums since 2002 and have toured throughout the world, including music festivals.

Liddiard released his debut solo album in 2010 and completed corresponding tours with support from artists such as Sydney, Australia musician Loene Carmen. The album earned him a nomination for a 2011 ARIA Award for Best Male Artist. In response to the nomination, Liddiard stated: "It's just for wankers, snorting coke and getting drunk. It's just not on my radar and I'm just not interested. The ARIAs don't really mean anything to me."

Together with Pereira, who left the Drones line-up, Liddiard contributed to the production of a self-titled album by Perth band Gutterville Splendour Six. Liddiard played guitar on fourteen songs, in addition to undertaking mixing and recording duties. All of the album's songs were recorded on an ADAT eight-track machine and the album was released as a vinyl record on Spanish record label Bang! Records.

Liddiard has cited Dimitri Shostakovich, Igor Stravinsky, The Stooges, North African music and Olivier Messiaen as musical influences. He has named Dylan Thomas, Flann O'Brien, W. B. Yeats, Carl Sagan and Kurt Vonnegut as influences on his lyricism. Regarding his own lyrics, Liddiard stated in 2013: "I read but I'm not that widely read. I don't know. They're just words for songs. That's all they are. Yeah, they're sometimes funny. You've got to be funny; life's funny."

Personal life
As of May 2019, Liddiard is a vegan and resides in the rural town of Nagambie, Victoria, Australia with Drones bassist Fiona Kitschin and two fox terriers. Prior to Nagambie, the pair lived in the rural Victorian town of Myrtleford. The Nagambie property, next to the Goulburn River, was the recording location for the 2013 Drones album I See Seaweed. Liddiard explained the location's attributes in a media interview: "It's as good as anywhere for writing, but the main thing is it's cheap, [...] There's a huge amount of room. We have a billabong, there's a swampland, a creek, we're on the river. It's nice."

Liddiard was living in the same area as the Black Saturday bushfires of 2009 and subsequently attained a 75 series Landcruiser Troop Carrier vehicle in the event of such an incident in the future. Liddiard explained in 2013 that "it's basically our ticket out of the next bushfire. In the last fires we had a 1990 Ford Falcon which wouldn't have been much use once a tree fell across the only road out of our valley."

Discography

Studio albums

Awards and nominations

APRA Awards
The APRA Awards are presented annually from 1982 by the Australasian Performing Right Association (APRA), "honouring composers and songwriters".

! 
|-
| 2014 
| "A Moat You Can Stand In" by The Drones (Stephen Hesketh/ Fiona Kitchin/ Gareth Liddiard/ Dan Luscombe/ Mike Noga)
| Song of the Year
| 
| 
|-
| 2019
| "Paradise" by Tropical Fuck Storm (Erica Dunn / Gareth Liddiard / Fiona Kitchin / Lauren Hammel)
| Song of the Year
| 
| 
|}

ARIA Music Awards
The ARIA Music Awards is an annual awards ceremony that recognises excellence, innovation, and achievement across all genres of Australian music. 

|-
| 2011
|Strange Tourist
| Best Male Artist
| 
|-

Australian Music Prize
The Australian Music Prize (the AMP) is an annual award of $30,000 given to an Australian band or solo artist in recognition of the merit of an album released during the year of award. The commenced in 2005.

|-
| 2010
|Strange Tourist
| Australian Music Prize
| 
|-

Music Victoria Awards
The Music Victoria Awards, are an annual awards night celebrating Victorian music. They commenced in 2005.

! 
|-
| rowspan="1"| 2018
| Gareth Liddiard
| Best Male Musician
| 
| rowspan="2"| 
|-
| rowspan="1"| 2019
| Gareth Liddiard
| Best Male Musician
| 
|-

National Live Music Awards
The National Live Music Awards (NLMAs) are a broad recognition of Australia's diverse live industry, celebrating the success of the Australian live scene. The awards commenced in 2016.

|-
| National Live Music Awards of 2016
| Gareth Liddiard
| Live Guitarist of the Year
| 
|-
| National Live Music Awards of 2018
| Gareth Liddiard
| Live Guitarist of the Year
| 
|-

References 

Living people
Australian guitarists
Australian singer-songwriters
Musicians from Victoria (Australia)
People from Port Hedland, Western Australia
1975 births
21st-century Australian singers
21st-century guitarists
ATP Recordings artists